Seoul Subway Line 7 of the Seoul Metropolitan Subway was built from 1990 to 1996 (Jangam-Konkuk Univ.) and was completed on August 1, 2000 (central section . Konkuk University to Sinpung); the western section between Sinpung and Onsu was put into service on February 29, 2000. This north-south line does not run through the city centre but links Gangnam directly to the northeastern districts of Seoul. In 2019, Line 7 had an annual ridership of 380 million or 1.04 million passengers per day. Although most trains stop an Jangam and Seongnam, some trains short turn at Onsu station.

All trains on Line 7 are monitored by 1,008 closed-circuit television cameras that were installed in June 2012.

The extension to Incheon Subway Line 1 was designed to relieve the traffic congestion in western Seoul and northern Incheon. Nine stations were added on October 27, 2012, for the  extension, starting from Onsu Station of Line 7 and ending at Bupyeong-gu Office Station of Incheon Subway Line 1. A western extension will add eight stations towards Incheon and will provide an interchange with Incheon Subway Line 1 and the AREX, while a northern extension will add six stations and will provide an interchange with the U Line.

Expansion 
Line 7 was extended west of Bupyeong-gu Office. Construction on the two-station,  extension to Seongnam began in 2013 and was completed on May 22, 2021. The extension will allow for transfers to Incheon Subway Line 2.

A further six-station extension to Cheongna International City station through Cheongna International City is currently planned and is not expected to open any earlier than 2027; the extension will allow for transfers to the airport railroad. Another further two-station extension through Incheon's metropolitan landfill to Geomdan Oryu station is also currently being planned.

Line 7 is also being extended north of Jangam to Yangju and Pocheon in two phases. The first phase, which started construction in late 2019 and is planned to open in 2025, will feature two stations, one of which will be Tapseok station, providing transfers to the Uijeongbu LRT. The second phase, which is still in planning, will feature four or five additional stations. The second phase may be operated as a shuttle service.

Stations

Rolling stock

Current

Seoul Metro 
 Seoul Metro 7000 series
 1st generation – since 1995
 2nd generation – since 1999
 3rd generation – since 2010
 4th generation – since 2019
 5th generation – since 2021
 (Future) 6th generation – since 2025
 (Future) 7th generation – since 2027
 (Future) 8th generation – since 2027
 (Future) 9th generation – since 2025
 (Future) 10th generation – since 2026

See also 
 Subways in South Korea
 Seoul Metropolitan Rapid Transit Corporation
 Seoul Metropolitan Subway

References

External links 

 Seoul Metropolitan Government's Line 7 extension page includes a route map and status information for the westward extension from Onsu.
 UrbanRail.Net's Seoul Subway Page
 Map, station and route finder

 
Seoul Metropolitan Subway lines
Railway lines opened in 1996
Metro stations in Gwangjin District